Michigamme Township is a civil township of Marquette County in the U.S. state of Michigan. The population was 327 at the 2020 census. The unincorporated community of Michigamme is located within the township.

Geography

Demographics
As of the census of 2000, there were 377 people, 180 households, and 127 families residing in the township.  The population density was 2.8 per square mile (1.1/km2).  There were 547 housing units at an average density of 4.1 per square mile (1.6/km2).  The racial makeup of the township was 98.94% White, 0.53% Native American, and 0.53% from two or more races.

There were 180 households, out of which 19.4% had children under the age of 18 living with them, 61.1% were married couples living together, 6.1% had a female householder with no husband present, and 29.4% were non-families. 26.7% of all households were made up of individuals, and 12.2% had someone living alone who was 65 years of age or older.  The average household size was 2.09 and the average family size was 2.43.

In the township the population was spread out, with 15.4% under the age of 18, 3.7% from 18 to 24, 20.4% from 25 to 44, 36.6% from 45 to 64, and 23.9% who were 65 years of age or older.  The median age was 51 years. For every 100 females, there were 97.4 males.  For every 100 females age 18 and over, there were 96.9 males.

The median income for a household in the township was $29,750, and the median income for a family was $34,063. Males had a median income of $30,208 versus $25,625 for females. The per capita income for the township was $24,549.  About 3.8% of families and 8.8% of the population were below the poverty line, including 8.9% of those under age 18 and 6.6% of those age 65 or over.

Highways
 passes briefly through the southernmost portion of the township through the community of Michigamme.

Current events
The Eagle mine project is located within Michgamme Township.

References

Townships in Marquette County, Michigan
Townships in Michigan